A Short History of the Catholic Church may refer to:
 A Short History of the Catholic Church (1993), book by José Orlandis,  .
 A Short History of the Catholic Church (2010), book by J. Derek Holmes and Bernard Bickers,  .

History books about Catholicism